is a Japanese manga series written and illustrated by Tatsuya Ara. It was serialized in Akita Shoten's shōnen manga magazine Weekly Shōnen Champion from May 2014 to October 2018, with its chapters collected in 24 tankōbon volumes. A sequel, titled Harigane Service Ace, started in the same magazine in November 2018. An anime television short film adaptation of Harigane Service premiered in the 15th episode of Animation x Paralympic in August 2022 to promote the 2024 Summer Paralympics.

Characters

Media

Manga
Written and illustrated by Tatsuya Ara, Harigane Service was serialized in Akita Shoten's shōnen manga magazine Weekly Shōnen Champion from May 29, 2014, to October 11, 2018. Akita Shoten collected its chapters in twenty-four tankōbon volumes, released from September 8, 2014, to January 8, 2019.

A sequel, titled , started in Weekly Shōnen Champion on November 8, 2018. The first tankōbon volume was released on April 8, 2019. As of August 8, 2022, eighteen volumes have been released.

A spin-off series, titled , started in Monthly Shōnen Champion on August 6, 2021. The first tankōbon volume was released on January 7, 2022. As of August 8, 2022, two volumes have been released.

Short anime film
In August 2022, an anime television short film adaptation of Harigane Service was announced. The film was produced by SynergySP, directed by Hiroyuki Ōshima and written by Ryūsuke Mori, with music composed by Rei Ishizuka. It premiered in the 15th episode of Animation x Paralympic on August 22, 2022 to promote the 2024 Summer Paralympics. The film's theme song is "Hyakusetsu Futo" by Hatsune Miku and dance group CONDENSE.

References

External links
  

2022 anime films
2024 Summer Paralympics
Akita Shoten manga
Anime films based on manga
Shōnen manga
Volleyball in anime and manga